Shigeko (written: ,  or ) is a feminine Japanese given name. Notable people with the name include:

, Japanese princess
, Japanese swimmer
, Japanese artist
, Japanese manga artist known by the pen-name Shungicu Uchida
, Japanese educator

Japanese feminine given names